This article contains a list of albums by Nat King Cole and compilations of his recordings, together with a list of his chart singles.

Capitol 78-rpm albums
Volumes 1-4 released as separate booklets in 10" format.  
Booklet Volumes 1 and 2 contain 4 shellac records.  
Booklet Volumes 3 and 4 contain 3 shellac records. Volume 4 is also issued in a box set of three 45-rpm records.  
 1945  The King Cole Trio
 1946  The King Cole Trio, Volume 2 
 1947  The King Cole Trio, Volume 3 
 1949  The King Cole Trio, Volume 4

Capitol 10" albums
 1950  Nat King Cole at the Piano 
 1950  Harvest of Hits
 1951  King Cole for Kids 
 1952  Penthouse Serenade 
 1952  Top Pops
 1953  Nat King Cole Sings for Two in Love 
 1954  Unforgettable (RIAA: Platinum)

Capitol 12" albums
 1955  Penthouse Serenade 
 1955  Nat King Cole Sings for Two In Love 
 1955  The Piano Style of Nat King Cole
 1957  Love Is the Thing (RIAA: Platinum)
 1957  After Midnight
 1957  Just One of Those Things
 1958  Cole Español
 1958  St. Louis Blues
 1958  The Very Thought of You
 1958  To Whom It May Concern
 1959  Welcome to the Club
 1959  A Mis Amigos
 1960  Tell Me All About Yourself
 1960  Every Time I Feel the Spirit
 1960  Wild Is Love
 1960  The Magic of Christmas (reissued in 1963 as The Christmas Song, substituting his 1961 recording of "The Christmas Song" for "God Rest Ye Merry Gentlemen") (RIAA: 6× Platinum)
 1961  The Nat King Cole Story
 1961  The Touch of Your Lips
 1962  Nat King Cole Sings/George Shearing Plays
 1962  Ramblin' Rose (RIAA: Platinum)
 1962  Dear Lonely Hearts
 1962  More Cole Español
 1963  Those Lazy-Hazy-Crazy Days of Summer
 1963  Where Did Everyone Go?
 1964  Nat King Cole Sings My Fair Lady
 1964  Let's Face the Music! (Recorded 1961)
 1964  I Don't Want to Be Hurt Anymore
 1965  L-O-V-E
 1966 Nat King Cole at the Sands (recorded live)

Original compilation albums
 1955  10th Anniversary Album
 1956  Ballads of the Day
 1957  This Is Nat King Cole
 1965 Sings Songs from Cat Ballou & Other Motion Pictures
 1965 Sings Hymns & Spirituals

Other compilation albums
 1965 Unforgettable
 1965 Nat King Cole Trio: The Vintage Years
 1965 Nature Boy
 1966 Longines Symphonette Society Presents the Unforgettable Nat King Cole (box set)
 1967 Stay as Sweet as You Are
 1968 Best of Nat King Cole (RIAA: Platinum)
 1970 The Magic of Christmas with Children (Safeway Supermarket promo LP)
 1972 The Greatest of Nat King Cole (2-album set sold by Dynamic House)
 1973 Nature Boy
 1974 Love Is Here to Stay
 1974 Love is a Many Splendored Thing
 1977 20 Golden Greats (BPI: Platinum, AUS: Platinum)
 1979 Reader's Digest Presents: The Great Nat King Cole (box set)
 1982 Greatest Love Songs (BPI: Platinum)
 1983 Unforgettable (Australia)
 1990 Hit That Jive, Jack
 1990 Jumpin' at Capitol
 1990 Capitol Collectors' Series (RIAA: Gold)
 1990 Cole, Christmas, & Kids
 1990 12 Historical Recordings (Conquistador; CONQ 009)
 1990 12 More Historical Recordings (Conquistador; CONQ 016)
 1991 The Complete Capitol Recordings of the Nat King Cole Trio (box set, Mosaic Records)
 1991 The Unforgettable Nat King Cole (RIAA: Gold, BPI: Silver)
 1992 Nat King Cole at the Movies
 1992 Christmas Favorites
 1992 The Best of the Nat King Cole Trio: The Instrumental Classics
 1993 The Billy May Sessions
 1993 Mis Mejores Canciones: 19 Super Exitos
 1994 Let's Face the Music & Dance
 1994 Greatest Hits (RIAA: Platinum)
 1996 Sincerely/The Beautiful Ballads
 1997 For Sentimental Reasons
 1997 Retro
 1998 The Frim Fram Sauce
 1998 Dear Lonely Hearts/I Don't Want to Be Hurt Anymore
 1999 Looking Back/Where Did Everyone Go?
 1999 Live at the Circle Room
 1999 The Christmas Song
 2000 Coast to Coast Live (1963 concert at Riverside Inn, Fresno, Calif., 1962 WNEW radio show)
 2000 Route 66
 2000 Christmas for Kids: From One to Ninety-Two 
 2001 Golden Greats
 2001 The King Swings
 2001 Try Not to Cry
 2001 Night Lights (radio recordings from 1956, most tracks previously unreleased)
 2003 Stepping Out of a Dream
 2003 The Classic Singles (4-CD book)
 2003 20 Golden Greats
 2003 The Best Of...
 2003 Love Songs (BPI: Silver)
 2003 The Nat King Cole Trio (with famous guests)
 2003 The One and Only Nat King Cole
 2004 Those Lazy, Hazy, Crazy Days of Summer/My Fair Lady
 2005 The World of Nat King Cole (bonus DVD added 2006) (BPI: Silver)
 2006 The Very Best of Nat King Cole
 2006 Stardust: The Complete Capitol Recordings, 1955–1959
 2006 L-O-V-E: The Complete Capitol Recordings, 1960–1964
 2008 Holiday Collection 2008: NBC Sounds of the Season
 2009 Re:Generations
 2014 The Extraordinary Nat King Cole

Chart singles

Holiday 100 chart entries
Since many radio stations in the US adopt a format change to Christmas music each December, many holiday hits have an annual spike in popularity during the last few weeks of the year and are retired once the season is over. In December 2011, Billboard began a Holiday Songs chart with 50 positions that monitors the last five weeks of each year to "rank the top holiday hits of all eras using the same methodology as the Hot 100, blending streaming, airplay, and sales data", and in 2013 the number of positions on the chart was doubled, resulting in the Holiday 100. A handful of Cole recordings have made appearances on the Holiday 100 and are noted below according to the holiday season in which they charted there.

References

"Both Sides Now" discographies at bsnpubs.com
Friedwald, Will (2006). Liner notes. In Cole, Nat King. Stardust: The Complete Capitol Recordings 1955–1959. Bear Family Records.
Friedwald, Will (2006). Liner notes. In Cole, Nat King. L-O-V-E: The Complete Capitol Recordings 1960–1964. Bear Family Records.

Discography
Vocal jazz discographies
Discographies of American artists